David A. Kaval (born October 28, 1975) is the seventh and current president of the Oakland Athletics of Major League Baseball. He previously served as president of Major League Soccer club San Jose Earthquakes and founded the Golden Baseball League.

Early life and education 
Kaval was born on October 28, 1975, to Jim and Paula Kaval. Jim, a member of the Peace Corps and real estate entrepreneur, and Paula, a realtor and school teacher, raised Kaval in Cleveland, Ohio. He is of Slovak and Italian descent. Kaval attended Stanford University and received a Bachelor of Arts in international relations in 1998. He later returned to Stanford for an MBA and did a national security budgets summer internship for the George W. Bush administration.

Career

Early career and the Golden Baseball League 
Following Stanford graduation, on June 20, 1998, Kaval and a former classmate began their trip to visit all 30 Major League Baseball ballparks in 38 days. The trip ultimately led to the publication of The Summer that Saved Baseball which chronicled their journey.

Kaval founded the independent Golden Baseball League in 2003 as part of a class project. The teams were run on just a $90,000 salary cap per season. In October 2010, Kaval left to become the president of Major League Soccer team San Jose Earthquakes which raised questions as to the future of the league. Those questions became answered when the league merged with two other leagues the year after Kaval's departure and ultimately ceased operations in 2012.

San Jose Earthquakes 
Kaval was named president of the San Jose Earthquakes in October 2010, taking over from Michael Crowley. During his time with the Earthquakes, the team won the 2012 Supporters' Shield, but failed to make the playoffs in every other season he oversaw. Despite numerous delays, the team was able to open Earthquakes Stadium in February 2015, which was the first soccer-specific stadium for the team.

It was announced in June 2017 that Kaval was replaced as team president by Tom Fox.

Oakland Athletics 
On November 17, 2016, David Kaval was named the seventh president in Oakland Athletics history. Kaval initially made a positive impression with fans upon assuming the position when he attempted to be more open to fans through scheduled meeting times, a tactic he previously employed with the San Jose Earthquakes. The A's also made fan and capital improvements to the Oakland Coliseum such as removing tarps which covered the Coliseum's third deck, creating a food truck rally with outdoor games, and investing $1M in upgrades to an all-access club called Shibe Park Tavern. Kaval's COO, Chris Giles, also spearheaded a membership campaign, "A's Access", which granted members with benefits that surpassed that of previous season ticket holders.

New ballpark efforts 

Kaval, who successfully built a stadium for the Earthquakes, sought to build a stadium for Oakland A's. In September 2017, Kaval announced that the A's had selected site near downtown Oakland owned by the Peralta Community College District as their desired location after considering the current Coliseum site and a Howard Terminal site at the Port of Oakland. The selection was immediately met with local opposition from students, teachers, and the nearby communities of Chinatown and Eastlake. The selection was also brought concern from Oakland mayor Libby Schaaf and former mayor Ron Dellums as the move would have displaced low-income and immigrant families and businesses from the surrounding area. Despite the concerns, Kaval attempted to move forward with the site and targeted an opening during the 2023 Major League Baseball season. In December 2017, the Peralta Community College District board turned down the A's proposal, leaving Kaval to backtrack to his lesser preferred locations.

Nearly a year after the Peralta-site rejection, Kaval and the A's announced the Howard Terminal site at the Port of Oakland as their primary focus in November 2018. Concerns and community opposition to the project was voiced primarily from the maritime industry, but also saw transportation and environmental groups become vocal about the site choice. Kaval progressed the project and on July 20, 2021, the Oakland City Council voted 6-1 (with one abstain vote) to approve a non-binding term sheet to continue negotiations with the A's for the new ballpark. However, Kaval said that the team did not agree to those terms since it was not the term sheet the team provided.

Personal life 
Kaval is married to Maria Fredricsson, whom he met his first day at Stanford. Kaval is a resident of Menlo Park, California, where the couple have raised their two daughters.

He serves on a number of boards, including the Bay Area Council and Rocketship Education, in addition to the National Governing Board of the Positive Coaching Alliance (PCA) and the Young Presidents' Organization (YPO). He is also a lecturer in management at the Stanford Graduate School of Business (GSB) where he teaches sports management.

References

External links
 Profile with the Athletics
 Profile with the Earthquakes
 Dave Kaval "Rooted in Oakland"

Living people
Oakland Athletics executives
Major League Baseball team presidents
San Jose Earthquakes executives
People from Cleveland
People from San Jose, California
Stanford University alumni
1975 births
American people of Slovak descent
American people of Italian descent